Lapoinya (pronounced La-poin-ya) is a small agricultural centre on the north-west coast of Tasmania west of Wynyard.  The name is Tasmanian Aboriginal word for "fern tree", a plant that abounds in those surviving untouched parts of the original temperate rainforest. At the 2006 census, Lapoinya had a population of 368.

History
First developed commercially around 1900 it has been a centre for forestry, mixed agriculture (especially potato-growing and grazing (mostly dairy cattle).

In November 2014 it was announced the town was fighting Forestry Tasmania to attempt to stop the company logging the towns surrounding forest. Following this, in January 2016 Bob Brown and three others were arrested during a protest of logging on a 49-hectare Forestry Tasmaia coupe at Lopoinya.

Lapoinya Post Office opened on 1 November 1912 and closed in 1970.

References

Localities of Waratah–Wynyard Council
Towns in Tasmania